Yoo Jong-hyun (Hanja: 劉宗賢; born 14 March 1988) is a South Korean footballer who plays as defender for FC Anyang in the K League 2.

Club career
Yoo was selected in the priority pick of the 2011 K-League Draft by Gwangju FC.

References

External links 

1988 births
Living people
South Korean footballers
Chungju Hummel FC players
Gwangju FC players
FC Anyang players
K League 1 players
K League 2 players
Konkuk University alumni
Association football defenders